Party of Common Sense is a Czech nationalist political party. It is led by Petr Hannig.

History
The party was founded in 2002 by Petr Hannig. The party succeeded in Havířov municipal election but received only 10,000 votes in 2002 legislative election ad failed to reach 5% threshold.

In 2010, party started collaboration with Czech Sovereignty and changed name to Sovereignty - Party of Common Sense. Cooperation later broke. The party returned to its original name in 2014.

Election results

Chamber of Deputies

European Parliament

Presidential

External links

References

Nationalist parties in the Czech Republic
Eurosceptic parties in the Czech Republic
Political parties established in 2002
2002 establishments in the Czech Republic